Southland College (SC), officially the Southland College of Kabankalan City, Inc., is a private, non-sectarian coeducational institution located in the second most progressive city in the province of Negros Occidental, Philippines, Kabankalan City.  Established in March 2009, it is one of the newest educational institutions in Negros Occidental.

Southland College offerings include levels from pre-school, grade school, junior high school and senior high school all the way up to the college level.

See also
List of universities and colleges in the Philippines

References

External links
Official website

Universities and colleges in Negros Occidental
Educational institutions established in 2009
2009 establishments in the Philippines